Kaʻiana, also known as Keawe-Kaʻiana-a-Ahuula, (born about 1755 - died 1795) was a Native Hawaiian (kānaka ʻōiwi/maoli) warrior and aliʻi (noble) of Puna, Hawai‘i, who turned against Kamehameha I in 1795 during his conquest of Oahu and then sided with the island's ruler, Kalanikupule.

Birth, siblings and cousins 

While Kaʻiana's place of birth is unknown, it is likely he was raised in Hilo. His mother was Kaupekamoku (w) the granddaughter of Ahia (w) from the "I" family of Hilo, Hawaii. His father was Ahuula-a-Keawe (k), a son of Keaweʻīkekahialiʻiokamoku (k). His name is sometimes recorded with different variations; Tianna, Tyaana, Ty-e-a-naa, Tianner, and Tayanah. Through his father, he is first cousin to much of the Island of Hawaii's nobility, including Kalaniʻōpuʻu (k), Keōua (k) and Keawema'uhili. His mother's pedigree included her paternal heritage to Oahu and Hilo, while her maternal line is from the Maui royal family. She was half sister to Kekaulike (k).

He had two half-brothers from his mother with whom he maintained close relationships with until their deaths rebelling against Kamehameha I. Their names were Namakeha (k) and Nāhiʻōleʻa (k). Their fathers were of the Maui royal family. Nāhiʻōleʻa is considered one of the fathers of Kekūanāoʻa along with Kiʻilaweau (k), both husbands of Inaina (w) in a tradition called poʻolua. The three brothers helped conquer Oahu with Kahekili II in the early 1780s but moved to Kauaʻi after becoming dissatisfied.

His cousin Kaʻiana Ukupe, a son of Kaolohaka (k), was the father of Kaikioʻewa, the first governor of Kauaʻi who joined forces along with others to support Kamehameha I. On March 8, 1779, either Kaʻiana-a-Ahuula or his cousin is recorded as "Taiana" traveling aboard the HMS Resolution from Kauaʻi to Niʻihau on the last leg of James Cook's third and final voyage before the navigators death. Kaʻiana was described by Captain John Meares: "He was near six feet five inches in stature, and the muscular form of his limbs was of Herculean appearance". Meares also stated that he carried himself; "replete with dignity, and having lived in the habit of receiving the respect due to superior rank in his own country, he possessed an air of distinction".

Kahekili II's conquest of Oʻahu 

Around 1770 Peleioholani (k), the aliʻi nui or mōʻī (supreme ruler) of Oʻahu died and was succeeded by his son Kumahana (k) who was deposed by a meeting of the aliʻi (nobles) in council and replaced by Kahahana. Kumahana took his family to Kauaʻi where they were given refuge in Waimea. Kumahana's only son Kaneoneo married Kamakahelei, a queen regnant of Kauaʻi and died attempting to regain Oʻahu. In 1782 Kaʻopulupulu, the kahuna nui (high priest) of Puʻu o Mahuka Heiau died, removing the last obstacle to invasion for Aliʻi Nui, Kahekili II of Maui. His forces launched from Lahaina, Maui and landed in Waikiki on Oʻahu with warriors that included Kaiʻana, Namakeha, and Nāhiʻōleʻa. After Kahahana's defeat many of the forces remained on Oʻahu including Kaʻiana and his brothers. They lived at Kāneʻohe and Heʻeia on the Windward Coast of the island. After two years, there was resistance to Maui's occupation. The people of Oʻahu gained the support of some of the Maui aliʻi, most notable being Kaʻiana, Namakeha, and Nāhiʻōleʻa. The conspiracy was discovered and while many of the Maui men were killed, Kaʻiana and his brothers escaped to Kauaʻi, which was now ruled by Kamakahelei and her husband Kāʻeokūlani, a son of Kekaulike, making him a half-brother of Kahekili.

Kauaʻi 
On Kauaʻi Kaʻiana and his brothers, as well as their families, were cared for by Kāʻeokūlani. When the first Europeans to return to the islands since the death of Cook arrived, they were greeted by Kāʻeokūlani and Kaʻiana, carrying his young daughter and accompanied by a large group of attendants. The “HMS King George” and the “Queen Charlotte" were captained by Nathaniel Portlock and George Dixon. The ships anchored off Waimea on June 19, 1786. Dixon says of Kaʻiana's daughter, that she was: 

Portlock wrote in his journal about the first Christmas on Kauai, December 1786. He had passed out small presents to the women and children and was then surprised by gifts of pigs and fresh vegetables delivered to his ship from Kaʻiana. A few months after Portlock and Dixon had left the island, in the summer of 1787, the "Nootka" arrived captained by John Meares. The ship stayed only a few months before sailing off with Kaʻiana on board. Some month before, Captain Charles William Barkley arrived at Oahʻu and took abord his ship, the Imperial Eagle, a Native Hawaiian woman or wahine. She was given a name which was an attempt at a phonetic spelling of the Hawaiian word. She was called "Wynee and served as a companion and Lady's maid for Barkley's wife Frances Barkley. When Dixon had returned from the Pacific Northwest, he was hoping to re-unite with Portlock and the "King George" at Kauaʻi in mid-September. He was told by ʻŌpūnui that another ship had arrived and left with Kaʻiana. He described Meares as "ʻeno", Hawaiian for a "wild and suspicious man" who had given no gifts in return for the provisions he was given. After his ship was provisioned Dixon returned gifts to Kāʻeokūlani of a large woolen cloak and an iron Adze. Portlock returned on October 3, 1787, but finding Dixon gone sailed on almost immediately.

Voyage to Canton 
On September 2, 1787, Ka'iana departed Hawai'i on John Meares' ship Nootka as Meares' guest. They arrived in Canton in October 1787. Ka'iana also visited Macao. After departing from Canton, Meares bought the ship Iphegenia. Meares gave command of the ship to William Douglas and transferred Ka'iana to it. Ka'iana and Douglas then sailed to the Philippines and the northwestern coast of North America. The Iphegenia arrived in Maui on December 6 or 7, 1788, where Ka'iana left the ship.

Kamehameha I's conquest of Oʻahu

Ancestry

Notes

References

Bibliography

 

 
 
 
 
 
 
 
 
 
 

People from Hawaii
Hawaiian nobility
Royalty of Hawaii (island)
Hawaiian military personnel
House of Keawe
1750s births
1795 deaths
Year of birth uncertain
Nobility of the Americas